Iowa Highway 183 (Iowa 183) is a state highway in western Iowa. It begins at an intersection with Iowa Highway 127 east of Mondamin and ends at an intersection with Iowa Highway 141 in Ute. The highway as currently constituted is the same as it was when it was commissioned in 1930. The first  of the route are a part of the Loess Hills Scenic Byway.

Previously, the highway began at U.S. Highway 30 in Missouri Valley.  It was extended to U.S. Highway 6 in Council Bluffs and then truncated to the northern city limits of Council Bluffs.  The previously existing segment between Missouri Valley and Council Bluffs was a portion of the Lincoln Highway and is now County Road L20 in Harrison and Pottawattamie Counties.

Route description

It heads north along the Loess Hills Scenic Byway (LHSB) with the Loess Hills rising immediately to the east. On the way to Pisgah, the highway approaches the Soldier River, which it follows for the rest of its routing. From Pisgah, Iowa 183 turns northeast and travels  to Moorhead, where the LHSB splits off to the north. Northeast of Moorhead, it continues  to Soldier, where it intersects Iowa Highway 37. The highway travels  further to Ute, where it ends at Iowa Highway 141.

History
Iowa 183 was designated in the 1930s along the same path the route follows today; however the route where it began east of Mondamin was US 75. Within ten years the entire route had been paved. After Interstate 29 (I-29) was built along the eastern bank of the Missouri River, Iowa 183 underwent some changes. In 1968, when US 75 was moved onto I-29, Iowa 183 was extended south to US 30 at Missouri Valley. A year later, it was extended further south along US 30A, ending at US 6 in Council Bluffs. Starting in the early 1980s, the Iowa Department of Transportation (Iowa DOT) began to shorten Iowa 183's route. By 1983, the route had been truncated to Council Bluffs's northern city limits. On July 1, 2003, the highway was shortened back to its original southern end east of Mondamin, now along Iowa 127.

Major intersections

References

External links

End of Iowa 183 at Iowa Highway Ends

183
Lincoln Highway
Transportation in Harrison County, Iowa
Transportation in Monona County, Iowa
U.S. Route 75